The USAFL National Championships is a tournament for Australian rules football in the United States.

Since 1997, the National Championships have been a large event featuring teams from the United States and Canada in four men's divisions and two women's divisions.  The competition is organized and run by the United States Australian Football League.

History
The first championships were held in Cincinnati in 1997, and they were won by the host Cincinnati Dockers.  The Queen City would host the first three Nationals, with the 1998 edition welcoming 10 teams.  The 2017 edition saw the largest turnout in the history of the carnival; 53 teams representing 42 clubs across North America took part, including a record 13 women's teams representing 27 USAFL and AFL Canada clubs.

The Denver Bulldogs have been the most successful club at Nationals, winning Men's Division 1 eight times, Women's Division 1 six times, and Men's Division 4 once.  The Austin Crows have won the second most titles, picking up their fifth Men's D1 crown in 2021.  The New York Magpies, San Diego Lions and Boston Demons are the only other multiple Men's D1 winners, each having won twice.

Canadian clubs were first invited to the USAFL Championships in 2006.  The first Canadian champions were the Vancouver Cougars in 2008.  The Calgary Kangaroos have won four Division 2 premierships while the AFL Quebec Saints have won two.

In 2005, the first USAFL Women's championships were held and were won by the Atlanta Lady Kookaburras.  The Lady Kookas took home the first three premierships until 2008, when their 19-game winning streak came to an end at the hands of the Calgary Kookaburras.  The Denver Lady Bulldogs then won six consecutive titles from 2010–15, winning 20 consecutive games in the process until losing to the Minnesota Freeze.  Their string of premierships ended at the hands of the San Francisco Iron Maidens, who have since gone on to claim five-in-a-row of their own from 2016-21.

Format

The USAFL tournament seeding committee sets the divisions and seeding of all teams at least two weeks prior to the tournament.  Teams are placed in divisions based on season performance, regional championships performance, previous Nationals’ performance, and team player availability. Teams are then seeded within each division, with teams that are geographically close together usually separated by pool to avoid matchups during the season repeating in the group stage. Clubs that aren’t able to field full sides are combined with others to ensure that everyone is able to play.

The Men’s Division 2 was created for the 1999 tournament, and has been used since 2001.  Men’s Division 3 was introduced in 2002, and Division 4 was added in 2007.  A standalone reserves division was used in 2017 and 2018.  A second women’s division was created to accommodate combined teams in 2015, though the women’s competition reverted to one division in 2021 due to reduced numbers as a result of the COVID-19 pandemic.

Matches at Nationals are 40 minutes long, which is half the length of a typical full Australian football match. Usually, matches are played as two, twenty-minute halves with no time on. For the 2021 tournament this was changed to four, ten-minute quarters to allow for restrictions surrounding water runners as a result of the COVID-19 pandemic.  Finals matches that are tied after forty minutes of play are decided by a five-minute extra time period, followed by golden point rules if the match is still tied.

Each team is guaranteed three games on the weekend, usually two on Saturday and one on Sunday.  Each division’s Grand Final is played on Sunday afternoon, with the Men’s Division 1 Grand Final being the final match of the weekend.    

The top three men's divisions and women's Division 1 are played as 18-a-side. All teams in Divisions One and men's Division Two must be single entity squads; they may not combine with other teams. Men's Division Three is played as 16-a-side if both teams agree. Division Four is played 14-a-side or 16-a-side, and women's Division two is played 14- or 16-a-side. As of 2017, in all divisions each team is permitted to dress a maximum of 24 players.

All Divisions are subject to the "50-50 Rule", which requires at least half of the players on the field at any one time to be "nationals" of the country that their team represents. Players of other origin are considered "non-nationals." Prior to 2009, the players were designated "Australian" and "non-Australian", with at least half of the players on the field needing to be "non-Australian."

In addition to premiership medals, awards are also given to outstanding players in each division. The Paul Roos Medal, named after the former AFL player and coach and former US Revolution coach, is awarded to each division's Best and Fairest. The Coopers Medal goes to the most consistent player in each division, while the Geoff Cann Medal goes to each of the Grand Final MVP's. The umpires of the Grand Final in each division are each awarded the Hayden Kennedy medal.

Locations
The USAFL had previously attempted to keep Nationals in the Midwestern part of the United States in order to keep travel costs down for teams on the East and West coasts, and for all teams to be able to bring as many players as they can. At the league's 2014 annual general meeting, USAFL president Denis Ryan stated that he wanted to have the three regions, East, Central, and West, alternate hosting duties.

The 2020 Nationals tournament, originally scheduled for Ontario, California the weekend of October 10-11, was cancelled due to the COVID-19 Pandemic. 
 1997 Cincinnati, Ohio
 1998 Cincinnati, Ohio
 1999 Cincinnati, Ohio
 2000 Los Angeles, California
 2001 Washington, DC
 2002 Kansas City, Missouri
 2003 Kansas City, Missouri
 2004 Atlanta, Georgia
 2005 Milwaukee, Wisconsin
 2006 Las Vegas, Nevada
 2007 Louisville, Kentucky
 2008 Colorado Springs, Colorado
 2009 Mason, Ohio
 2010 Louisville, Kentucky
 2011 Austin, Texas
 2012 Mason, Ohio
 2013 Austin, Texas
 2014 Dublin, Ohio
 2015 Austin, Texas
 2016 Sarasota/Bradenton, Florida
 2017 San Diego, California
 2018 Racine, Wisconsin
2019 Sarasota/Bradenton, Florida
2020 Cancelled due to the COVID-19 pandemic
2021 Austin, Texas (Onion Creek Sports Park)
2022 Ontario, California (Silverlakes Sports Park, Norco)

Yearly Results

List of USAFL National Championship Premiers (Men)

List of USAFL National Championship Premiers (Women) 

*In 2016, the Bulldogs finished second in a round robin where no Grand Final was played.

See also

US Footy

References

External links
About the USAFL
USAFL Nationals

Australian rules football competitions
Australian
Sports competitions in the United States
Australian rules football competitions in the United States